The Kanosh Formation is a geologic formation in Utah and Nevada. It preserves fossils dating back to the Middle Ordovician period.

See also

 List of fossiliferous stratigraphic units in Nevada
 List of fossiliferous stratigraphic units in Utah
 Paleontology in Nevada
 Paleontology in Utah

References
 

Ordovician geology of Nevada
Ordovician geology of Utah
Ordovician southern paleotropical deposits